Kevin Patrick Pickford (born March 12, 1975) is a retired Major League Baseball pitcher. He played during one season at the major league level for the San Diego Padres. He was initially offered a scholarship to Florida State. He was drafted by the Pittsburgh Pirates in the 2nd round of the 1993 amateur draft. He batted .371 his final year of high school.

References

1975 births
Living people
Sportspeople from Fresno, California
Major League Baseball pitchers
San Diego Padres players
Baseball players from California
Nashville Sounds players
Sonoma County Crushers players
Gulf Coast Pirates players
Augusta GreenJackets players
Welland Pirates players
Lynchburg Hillcats players
Carolina Mudcats players
Altoona Curve players
Portland Beavers players
Fresno Grizzlies players
Macoto Cobras players
American expatriate baseball players in Taiwan